This is a list of association football sub-confederations, governing bodies made up of national football associations from regional areas within FIFA's continental federations.

Africa (CAF) 

 CECAFA - Council of East and Central African Football Associations
 COSAFA - Council of South African Football Associations
 WAFU - West African Football Union
 UNAF - Union of North African Football Federations
 UNIFFAC - Central African Football Federations' Union

Asia (AFC)

AFF - ASEAN Football Federation
CAFA - Central Asian Football Association
EAFF - East Asian Football Federation
SAFF - South Asian Football Federation
WAFF - West Asian Football Federation

North, Central America and the Caribbean (CONCACAF)
 CFU - Caribbean Football Union
 UNCAF - Central American Football Union
 NAFU - North American Football Union

See also 

 List of association football competitions
 List of association football terms

References